Frank Evans Ray (April 28, 1909 – August 6, 1963) was an American Negro league outfielder in the 1930s.

A native of Athens, Georgia, Ray attended Morris Brown College and played for the Montgomery Grey Sox in 1932. In 26 recorded games, he posted 16 hits in 95 plate appearances. Ray died in Tuskegee, Alabama in 1963 at age 54.

References

External links
 and Seamheads

1909 births
1963 deaths
Montgomery Grey Sox players
Baseball outfielders
Baseball players from Georgia (U.S. state)
Sportspeople from Athens, Georgia
20th-century African-American sportspeople